Roman Nikolayevich Markelov (born 16 July 1984) is a former Russian professional football player.

Club career
He played in the Russian Football National League for FC Dynamo Makhachkala in 2006.

External links
 
 

1984 births
Living people
Russian footballers
Association football midfielders
FC Zhemchuzhina Sochi players
FC Okean Nakhodka players
FC Mashuk-KMV Pyatigorsk players
FC Dynamo Makhachkala players